Qaderabad (also Romanized as Qāderābād; also known as Qādirābād) is a village in Sheshdeh Rural District, Sheshdeh and Qarah Bulaq District, Fasa County, Fars Province, Iran. At the 2006 census, its population was 339, in 80 families.

References 

Populated places in Fasa County